Mayakovsky Peak is a peak in Pamir Mountains.

It is located in the extreme south-west corner of Tajikistan's Gorno-Badakhshan Autonomous Province (Ishkoshim District), where the north–south Ishkoshim Range joins the east–west Shakhdara Range. Elevation 6,096 m. Discovered in the early 1930s by Soviet explorer Pavel Luknitsky, who gave it a figurative name, Three-Headed Peak. After the first ascent by Soviet alpinists in 1947, the peak was renamed in honor of the Soviet Russian poet Vladimir Mayakovsky (1893-1930). The 1947 Soviet expedition was led by V. Budenov.

See also
List of mountains of Tajikistan

References

Mountains of Tajikistan
Gorno-Badakhshan Autonomous Region
Six-thousanders of the Pamir